Gedrosia is the Hellenized name of the part of coastal Balochistan that roughly corresponds to today's Makran. In books about Alexander the Great and his successors, the area referred to as Gedrosia runs from the Indus River to the north-eastern edge of the Strait of Hormuz. It is directly to the south of the countries of Bactria, Arachosia and Drangiana, to the east of the country of Carmania and due west of the Indus River which formed a natural boundary between it and Western India. The native name of Gedrosia might have been Gwadar as there are two towns by that name and a bay (Gwadar Bay) in central Makran.

Geography
Pliny the Elder while explaining the extent of India included four satrapies Arachosia, Gedrosia, Aria and Parapanisidae as western borders of India.

People
According to Arrian, Nearchus mentions a race called Ichthyophagi ("fish-eaters") as inhabiting the barren shores of the Gwadar and Pasni districts in Makrān. During the homeward march of Alexander the Great, his admiral, Nearchus led a fleet in Arabian Sea along the Makrān coast and recorded that the area was dry and mountainous, inhabited by the Ichthyophagoi or Fish-Eaters. They are also identified on the 4th century Peutinger Map, as a people of the Baluchistan coast. The existence of such tribes was confirmed by Sir Richard F Burton.

Another group of people named as Oreitans were mentioned inhabiting modern Lasbela District in Balochistan province of Pakistan. Alexander the Great crossed Hub River through Lasbela on his way back to Babylon after conquering Northwestern India. Alexander mentions the river name as Arabius, and local people as Oreitans.

History 
Gedrosia is a dry, mountainous country along the northwestern shores of the Indian Ocean. It was occupied in the Bronze Age by people who settled in the few oases in the region. Other people settled on the coast and became known in Greek as Ichthyophagi.

Gedrosia (satrapy)

The Persian king Cyrus the Great attacked to conquer this country but was defeated and lost his entire army (559-530 BCE). Finally after the defeat of the sons of Cyrus this country conquered by Darius the great. although information about his campaign is comparatively late. The capital of Gedrosia was Pura, which is probably identical to modern Bampur, forty kilometers west of Irânshahr.

Several scholars have argued that the Persian satrapy Maka is identical to Gedrosia (which is a Greek name). One argument is the similarity of the name Maka to the modern name Makran, a part of Pakistan and Iran that is situated a bit more to the east. However, it is more likely that Maka is to be sought in modern Oman, which was called Maketa in Antiquity.

Alexander's campaign
Gedrosia became famous in Europe when the Macedonian king Alexander the Great tried to cross the Gedrosian desert and lost one third of his men.

Following his army's refusal to continue marching east at the Hyphasis River in 326 BCE, Alexander the Great crossed the area after sailing south to the coast of the Indian Ocean on his way back to Babylon. Upon reaching the Ocean, Alexander divided his forces in half, sending half back by sea to Susa under the command of Nearchus. The other half of his army was to accompany him on a march through the Gedrosian desert, inland from the ocean. Throughout the 60-day march through the desert, Alexander lost at least 12,000 soldiers, in addition to countless livestock, camp followers, and most of his baggage train. Some historians say he lost three-quarters of his army to the harsh desert conditions along the way. However, this figure was likely based on exaggerated numbers in his forces prior to the march, which were likely in the range of no fewer than 30,000 soldiers.

There are two competing theories for the purpose of Alexander's decision to march through the desert rather than along the more hospitable coast. The first argues that this was an attempt to punish his men for their refusal to continue eastward at the Hyphasis River. The other argues that Alexander was attempting to imitate and succeed in the actions of Cyrus the Great, who had failed to cross the desert.

After the death of Alexander, this region became part of the holdings of Seleucus, who held Ariya, Arachosia, and Gandhara, in addition to Gedrosia.

Mauryan Empire
The territories, known collectively as Ariyana were later lost to the Mauryan Empire of ancient India under the reign of Chandragupta Maurya. Gedrosia, along with Saurashtra, were regions in ancient India that formed an important part of the Maurya Empire, before being attacked by Indo-Greeks from the west.

See also
Gedrosia (satrapy)
Zephyrus (soldier)
Hannibal's crossing of the Alps
Balochistan

References

Bibliography

Balochistan
Maurya Empire
Historical Indian regions
Historical regions of Pakistan
Ancient Greek geography